The 2008 FIA GT Championship season was the twelfth season of the FIA GT Championship. It featured a series for Grand Touring style cars broken into two classes based on power and manufacturer involvement, called GT1 and GT2. Invitational G2 and G3 classes were also allowed to participate but cars in these classes were not eligible to score points. The Championship began on 20 April 2008 and ended on 23 November 2008 after 10 rounds.

Schedule
The official 2008 calendar was released by the FIA on 24 October 2007. All races were two hours, with exception of the Spa 24 Hours and the Bucharest City Challenge, the latter being a combination of two one-hour races, each awarding half points. The Adria round remained as a night event and the Argentinian finale was the first South American race in FIA GT Championship history.

Entries

GT1

A † symbol and gray background denotes an entry and driver competing in the Citation Cup.

GT2

Season results
Overall winners in bold.

Teams championships
Points were awarded to the top 8 finishers in the order of 10–8–6–5–4–3–2–1 except at the Spa 24 Hours, where half points were also granted for the leaders after 6 and 12 hours.  Both cars scored points towards the championship regardless of finishing position.  The G2 class did not have a championship.

GT1 standings

GT2 standings

Drivers championships
Points were awarded to the top 8 finishers in the order of 10–8–6–5–4–3–2–1 except at the Spa 24 Hours. Drivers who did not drive the car for a minimum of 35 minutes did not score points.

GT1 standings

GT2 standings

Citation Cup standings
The Citation Cup, which was limited to non-professional drivers competing in GT1 cars, did not include the Spa 24 Hours (Round 6) and the San Luis 2 Hours (Round 10).

Team & driver changes
 BMS Scuderia Italia entered two Ferrari F430 GT2's, replacing the sole Porsche 997 GT3-RSR
 Gigawave Motorsport contested the full season in 2008 running one Aston Martin DBR9 driven by Allan Simonsen and Philipp Peter. Gigawave also entered one Aston Martin V8 Vantage GT2 in the GT2 class.
 A new team, CR Scuderia, entered two Ferrari F430 GT2's in the GT2 class, driven by Chris Niarchos, Andrew Kirkaldy, Rob Bell, and Tim Mullen.
 PK Carsport replaced their sole Corvette C5-R with a Saleen S7-R.

References

External links
 Official FIA GT Website as at 18 December 2008
 2008 FIA GT Championship points tables at www.fiagt.com via web.archive.org
 2008 FIA GT Championship race results Retrieved from www.teamdan.com on 15 January 2009
2008 FIA GT Championship images Retrieved from www.motorsport.com on 3 March 2009

FIA GT Championship seasons